James Arnold Taylor (born July 22, 1969), also known by his initials JAT, is an American voice actor, writer, producer and podcaster. He is known for portraying Ratchet in the Ratchet & Clank franchise, the main character Tidus in Final Fantasy X, Shuyin in Final Fantasy X-2, Obi-Wan Kenobi in the Star Wars animated features such as Star Wars: The Clone Wars and the franchise's video games, and the titular character in the animated series Johnny Test.

Early life
Taylor was born in Santa Barbara, California on July 22, 1969.

Career

Taylor began his voice acting career in 1995.

He has been an active member of the voice acting community since, appearing in numerous roles, including Ratchet in the Ratchet & Clank video game series and Tidus from Final Fantasy X. From 2005 until 2011, Taylor also voiced Fred Flintstone in commercials and promotional material, following the death of Henry Corden.

In 2013, he published the book JAT 365: 365 Inspirations for the Pursuit of Your Dreams. In 2018, he began the podcast Talking to Myself.

Personal life
Taylor has been married to his wife Allison, since 1991. Together they have a daughter, Lydia, who also played the part of Mackenzie Huntington in Animal Crackers. He is a Christian.

Filmography

Voice-over roles

Film

Animation

Anime

Video games

Live action roles

Web

References

External links

 
 
 
 
 
 Interview w/ James about Batman: Brave & the Bold (Legions of Gotham)

Living people
American Christians
American impressionists (entertainers)
American male film actors
American male television actors
American male video game actors
American male voice actors
Male actors from Santa Barbara, California
20th-century American male actors
21st-century American male actors
1969 births